The P-900 Alfa (or also P-900A Alfa) П-900 3М51 Альфа Alfa AFM-L, GRAU designation 3M51, is an anti-ship missile (with LACM capabilities) developed from SS-N-30 (3M14), P-800 Oniks and P-700 Granit.

The missile has a Granit type engine. It can be operated on new Yasen-class submarine, and can be loaded on ships. Coastal versions of the anti-ship missile are under development. The missile is developed at NPO Mashinostroyeniya.

3M-51 Alfa is also designated as Novator KTRV, Morinform Agat, 3M54, 3M54E and P-900 types.

The new cruise missile was designed for use in the Russian Navy. Modernization of Kirov-class battlecruiser, other new battlecruisers, destroyers and cruisers may include 3M-51 Alfa that can be refitted on ships with existing Zircon, Grom Meteorit, GELA, P1200 Bolid or P-1000 Vulkan missile launchers.

Despite a secrecy surrounding the new missile, it can be presumed that it holds promise as an exportable weapons system.

See also
 Yasen-class submarine
 Qader
 Storm Shadow
 Atmaca
 Babur
 SOM
 Noor ASCM
 Zafar
 Khalij Fars
 3M-54 Klub
 BrahMos
 BrahMos-II
 Kh-90
 Perseus (missile)

References

AFM-L Alfa (Federation of American Scientists)
3M51 Alfa (Missile Threat)

Weapons of Russia
 
Anti-ship cruise missiles of Russia
Nuclear cruise missiles of Russia
Cruise missiles of Russia
Submarine-launched cruise missiles of Russia
NPO Mashinostroyeniya products